Pacific Centre (officially CF Pacific Centre since 2015) is a shopping mall located in Vancouver, British Columbia, Canada. It is owned by Cadillac Fairview, the Ontario Pension Board, and the Workplace Safety and Insurance Board, and is managed by Cadillac Fairview.

Based on the number of stores, most of which are underground, it is the largest mall in Downtown Vancouver, with over 100 stores and shops, and the seventh-busiest mall in Canada, with 22.1million annual visitors as of 2018. The mall is directly connected to the Hudson's Bay department store, Vancouver Centre Mall, two SkyTrain subway stations, and the former Four Seasons Hotel Vancouver.

History 
Built between 1971 and 1973, it was an unofficial Eaton Centre. It is a joint venture of Cemp Investments, Toronto Dominion Bank and T. Eaton Company Limited. The Pacific Centre was home to an Eaton's department store, succeeded by Sears Canada after 2002 and vacated in the fall of 2012. A Nordstrom store opened in its former space in 2015.

The City of Vancouver approved a 578,000 sq ft. expansion of Pacific Centre, including retail premises that will extend to the street on both sides of West Georgia Street, and a direct link connecting the shopping centre with the new Vancouver City Centre SkyTrain station on Granville Street. The link opened in the summer of 2009 in conjunction with the opening of the Canada Line.

On 20 January 2017, Cadillac Fairview announced an agreement to sell a 50 percent interest in its Vancouver properties, including Pacific Centre, to the Ontario Pension Board and Ontario's Workplace Safety and Insurance Board, each to hold a 25% stake. Cadillac Fairview, itself a subsidiary of the Ontario Teachers' Pension Plan, will retain the remaining 50% interest and continue to manage the properties.

The rotunda glass dome at the northeast corner of the intersection of West Georgia Street and Howe Street, is in the process of being redeveloped in 2020. Cadillac Fairview will construct a new two-storey pavilion building with 14,000 sq. ft. of floor area which will include a new Apple flagship store.

List of anchor stores

Transportation 
Pacific Centre is located at the Granville Mall, which is a junction between the Expo and Canada Lines of Vancouver's SkyTrain rapid transit system. Two stations service the mall, Granville and Vancouver City Centre station, respectively.

Incidents 
In November 2012, BC attorney general Shirley Bond ordered an investigation into a Downtown Vancouver Business Improvement Association (DVBIA) Genesis Security undercover security guard who physically assaulted a person with a disability whom he had accused of shoplifting. During the altercation, which was recorded on security cameras and witnesses' cellphones, the guard was seen hitting the man, throwing him from his wheelchair, and yelling profanities at him. In January 2013, the Ministry of Justice ruled that the guard had used unnecessary force. He was fined $230 and had his security license suspended for two month with a condition requiring re-certification on use of force before he could receive his license.

Gallery

See also 
 List of largest shopping malls in Canada
 Hotel Vancouver (1916), which once sat on the site of Pacific Centre

References 

 Cadillac Fairview Retail Site

https://www.bcbusiness.ca/fear-factor-vancouver-crime-and-the-private-security-industry

External links
 Pacific Centre official site
 City of Vancouver Development Permit Board report on expansion proposal

Shopping malls established in 1971
Buildings and structures in Vancouver
Shopping malls in Metro Vancouver
Tourist attractions in Vancouver
Cadillac Fairview